The 1981–82 Bulgarian Hockey League season was the 30th season of the Bulgarian Hockey League, the top level of ice hockey in Bulgaria. Six teams participated in the league, and Levski-Spartak Sofia won the championship.

Standings

External links
 Season on hockeyarchives.info

Bulgaria
Bulgarian Hockey League seasons
Bulg